Sodom is a German thrash metal band from Gelsenkirchen, formed in 1981. They have gone through many lineup changes, leaving bassist/vocalist Tom Angelripper as the only constant member. The band is currently composed of Angelripper, guitarists Frank "Blackfire" Gosdzik (who was a member of Sodom from 1987 to 1989 and rejoined in 2018) and Yorck Segatz, and drummer Toni Merkel. Along with Kreator, Destruction and Tankard, Sodom has been referred to as one of the "Big Four" of Teutonic thrash metal. Sodom heavily influenced the German black metal scene. In addition, the band is regarded as a pioneer of early death metal. Mike McPadden wrote that the most Venom-blackened of German "Three Kings"(The others are Destruction and kreator), Sodom further merged thrash and death metal into a wicked and decadent sound.

Sodom has released seventeen studio albums, three live albums, two compilation albums and seven EPs. They achieved their first commercial success with their fourth studio album Agent Orange (1989), which was one of the first thrash metal albums to enter the German album charts, where it reached number 36. Their most recent studio album, Genesis XIX, was released on 27 November 2020. Sodom is one of the best-selling thrash metal acts of all time, having sold over two million records.

History

Formation and early black metal years (1981–1986)

Sodom's original line-up consisted of Tom Angelripper, Bloody Monster, Arius "Blasphemer", and Aggressor. Reportedly named in reference to the Venom song "One Thousand Days in Sodom", the band was initiated by Tom as a desperate attempt to get out of having to work in coal mines in his home town of Gelsenkirchen. The band became a cohesive unit when Chris Witchhunter (Christian Dudek) from Essen replaced Bloody Monster on drums, bringing songwriting experience from his time in school, and spearheading the creativity process after Arius had been fired. Taking inspiration from bands such as Iron Maiden, Judas Priest, Motörhead, Venom, Kiss, Tank, Accept, Raven, Rainbow, AC/DC and UFO, the group continued as a three-piece in the Motörhead-fashion and released two demos which led to a record deal with Steamhammer. Aggressor left the band shortly before releasing the In the Sign of Evil EP (which is generally regarded as an important early black metal release), and was replaced by Grave Violator, who himself did not last long, and left following the recording of In the Sign of Evil. Michael "Destructor" Wulf was found as a replacement, after which the band went and recorded Obsessed by Cruelty, their full-length debut featuring music that was mostly in the vein of In the Sign of Evil. Wulf did not last in the band long, and later went and joined Kreator (where he also only had a short stint; he died after a tragic motorcycle accident in 1993).

Change to thrash metal and increasing popularity (1987–1990)
For the most part, Sodom was at first not taken seriously, with various press sources describing them as "a second-rate Venom clone with semi-inventive lyrics". One member would change that. Frank "Blackfire" Gosdzik came in to fill the guitar spot Wulf had left behind. Frank convinced Tom that thrash metal was moving beyond horror/occult/satanic themes of bands like Venom to embrace political, societal, and war themes. Tom was already interested in various wars yet remained a peacenik. New inspiration culminated into Frank's full-length debut with the band, Persecution Mania. The new lyrical approach and increased musicianship on the part of Frank gave the band great acclaim (as well as a gas-masked mascot Knarrenheinz, who appeared for the first time on Persecution Mania'''s cover). They subsequently toured Europe with Whiplash, Destruction, and Coroner, and embarked on their only North American tour to date. After that, the band returned to the studio to make another album. The resulting album, Agent Orange (1989), sold 100,000 copies in Germany alone. It was this album that made Sodom famous, giving them worldwide critical acclaim, and secured their place alongside Kreator and Destruction as one of the great Teutonic thrash metal bands. To this date, Agent Orange has sold more than any other German thrash metal album in the world. In support of the album, Sodom went on tour with a then-relatively unknown Sepultura.

Problems were brewing inside of the band, however. Tom and Chris descended further into alcoholism. Furthermore, Frank had grown tired of composing music that his bandmates would often perform poorly live. Mille Petrozza offered Frank a position with his band Kreator, after they lost their second guitarist, and Frank accepted. Angelripper went out looking for a replacement and found Michael Hoffmann, formerly of German thrashers Assassin.

Changes in formation (1990–1996)

With a new line-up, the album Better off Dead was released in 1990, and another grueling tour in Europe followed, playing with bands like Acid Drinkers, Destruction, Accu§er, Running Wild, Coroner, Tankard and Atrocity. During the South American tour, Hoffmann decided to stay in Brazil and was therefore forced to quit. Andy Brings replaced him, and a new album was recorded, Tapping the Vein (1992), with more of a death metal sound. This proved to be the last album with the drummer Witchhunter: He was kicked out of the band, and Atomic Steif formerly of both Holy Moses and Living Death became his replacement behind the drum kit.

On 15 September 1991, Sodom played in Sofia, Bulgaria. The show was notable for the band because the audience of fifteen thousand people was one of the largest they had ever as a headliner. It was notable for the audience because it was the first show of a Western metal band in Bulgaria after the fall of communism (the only remotely similar event being a performance of the hard rock band Uriah Heep in 1987).

The group's next album, Get What You Deserve (1994), saw them tone down the death metal sound of its predecessor in favor of a hardcore punk-influenced sound. Get What You Deserve had an arguably grotesque album cover (featuring a dead man shot and lying in his bed with a woman tied-up nearby), and many fans did not take to the band's new direction. This period also marked the beginning of less international visibility for the band as thrash lost its commercial viability for the remainder of the 1990s due to Grunge and alternative rock. Angelripper also started a solo career doing metal impressions of drinking songs, German Schlagers and even Christmas-type carols. A live album was recorded of the tour in support of the resulting album called Marooned – Live.Masquerade in Blood, saw the death metal influences return, as well as some groove metal elements kicking in, but still was pretty much in the same vein as their previous studio effort. It was released in 1995. Again another guitarist had to be found. The new choice, Strahli, did not stay very long with the band. He was arrested and imprisoned on drug-related matters, and the band had since lost contact with him, until January 2011, when they learned he had died in Düsseldorf. Atomic Steif also left and again Angelripper needed to search for new members. These were found: a guitarist in Bernemann and a drummer in Bobby Schottkowski. This line-up stabilized the band significantly and lasted until December 2010, when Schottkowski left.

Return to thrash metal (1997–2009)

The album 'Til Death Do Us Unite featured a controversial album cover, depicting a woman's pregnant belly and a man's beer gut pressing in a human skull together. This album marked the beginning of Sodom's return to thrash but was still more along the lines of a thrash-crossover sound and had much in common with bands like Suicidal Tendencies. It also spawned the song for which Sodom would make their most famous music video, the highly-controversial song "Fuck the Police". After this album, Sodom returned to the studio and released Code Red in 1999 which marked a full return to the Teutonic thrash metal sound of the 1980s, and it was met with praise from fans and press alike. A limited edition featured a bonus CD containing a tribute to Sodom album, Homage to the Gods. With 2001 came the release of M-16, a concept album about the movie Apocalypse Now, which took its title from the famed M16 assault rifle.

In 2003, a double live album was recorded in Bangkok, Thailand, titled One Night in Bangkok. A new album simply titled Sodom was released in 2006, in the same vein as M-16. The title was chosen – as Angelripper explained it – "because every band needs a self-titled album", and the band had never released one. The album was delayed however, because the DVD Lords of Depravity took more time to compose than initially thought.

In 2007, Tom was asked by the record label Steamhammer for any tracks to be released on the In the Sign of Evil EP. Tom believed there were, and the label floated the idea to Tom to get ex-members Chris Witchhunter and Grave Violator (real name: Franz Josef "Peppi" Dominik) to re-record the EP with the bonus tracks. The result became The Final Sign of Evil. Chris "Witchhunter" Dudek died on 7 September 2008 from liver failure after a long battle with illness.

In 2009, Sodom returned to the UK to play their first show in 20 years at Bloodstock Open Air.

Markus Makka Freiwald-era (2010–2017)In War and Pieces, Sodom's thirteenth studio album, was released in Europe on 22 November 2010, and released in North America on 11 January 2011. On 30 November 2010, it was announced that Bobby Schottkowski would be leaving the band, due to "personal and private problems" between Tom Angelripper and Schottkowski. On 8 December 2010, Markus "Makka" Freiwald was announced to be Sodom's new drummer.

In late January 2012, Sodom began writing their fourteenth studio album, which they planned to record in May 2012 for a late summer release. On 17 December 2012, the band announced the album would be released on 29 April 2013. The album is titled Epitome of Torture and features 13 tracks. The album was released in Germany on 26 April, and in the US on 7 May.

In November 2014, Sodom released the EP Sacred Warpath as a preview of their fifteenth studio album. The EP contains one original studio track, and live versions of three previously released songs.

On 9 June 2016, Sodom announced their fifteenth studio album Decision Day on their Facebook page. It was released on August 26 of that year.

Sodom released the compilation album, Demonized, on 1 September 2017. Available only on cassette and 12" vinyl, it features the band's first two demo recordings, Witching Metal from 1982 and Victims of Death from 1984.

Shortly after the release of Decision Day, Angelripper stated that Sodom had "some ideas for [their] next album which [they] want to bring out in 2018."

Reunion with Frank Blackfire Gosdzik (2017–present)

On 3 December 2017, Sodom announced that they would reunite with three of their former guitarists Josef "Grave Violator" Dominic (who performed on In the Sign of Evil), Frank "Blackfire" Gosdzik (Persecution Mania and Agent Orange) and Andy Brings (Tapping the Vein and Get What You Deserve) during their 35th anniversary show on 26 December in Bochum, Germany, marking the first time since Dominic, Gosdzik and Brings left the band in 1985, 1989, and 1995, respectively, that either guitarist had performed live with Sodom. Their previous performances were at Wacken in 2007. They performed three songs separate from one another's appearances from the respective albums they appeared on.

On 5 January 2018, Angelripper announced his partings from Bernemann and Makka "to pave the way for new challenges." He then said that he would introduce the new members on 7 April at the 2018 edition of the Full Metal Mountain festival, and that they would work on a new album together. Bernemann and Makka later said that they were fired from the band via WhatsApp without Angelripper listening to the new material they were working on for the band's next album. On 22 January 2018, Angelripper announced that he had expanded the band's line-up as a four piece. He was rejoined by guitarist Frank "Blackfire" Gosdzik and added Stefan "Husky" Hüskens and Yorck Segatz as the band's new drummer and second guitarist respectively. On 26 February 2018, Sodom cancelled their appearance at the Full Metal Mountain festival "due to the short-term change of line-up and the restructuring of my band Sodom", as explained by Angelripper. He then said that the time was "simply too short to put the new line-up in a solid live set". The new line-up of the band made their live debut on 18 May at the 2018 edition of the Rock Hard Festival. Sodom also participated in the 2018 installment of the MTV Headbangers Ball European Tour with Death Angel, Suicidal Angels and Exodus from late November to mid-December. This new lineup recorded the EPs Partisan (2018) and Out of the Frontline Trench (2019).

On 13 January 2020, drummer Stefan "Husky" Hüskens departed the band due to "some changes at [his] full-time job, as well as a few other matters", and would not return in the future. He was replaced by Toni Merkel.

On 12 June 2020, Sodom announced that they had begun recording their sixteenth studio album, entitled Genesis XIX, at Woodhouse Studio in Hagen, Germany with producer Siggi Bemm. Mixing of the album was completed in August 2020. A month later, it was announced that the album would be released on 27 November.

On 11 May 2021, Sodom announced an upcoming EP titled Bombenhagel, containing a re-recorded version of the song "Bombenhagel" from their 1987 studio album Persecution Mania as well as two new tracks, set to be released on 20 August.

In a December 2021 interview with Rockman, Tom Angelripper revealed that Sodom has begun writing new material for their next album. A month later, Sodom was announced as one of the bands to have its contract with SPV/Steamhammer Records renewed. In May 2022, Angelripper said that the band's new album will be released in 2023.

To coincide with its 40th anniversary, Sodom released the compilation album 40 Years at War – The Greatest Hell of Sodom on October 28, 2022. The set includes one song from each of the band's studio albums between Obsessed by Cruelty and Genesis XIX, in addition to "Sepulchral Voice" from the In the Sign of Evil EP.

Musical style, influences, lyrical themes, and legacy
In the early days Sodom's lyrics focused on Satanic and occult themes, but since Persecution Mania, most of their songs have covered topics based on, inspired by, or related to the concepts of war, politics, fascism and world history. Some of their songs have also covered topics dealing with religion, rape or sexual intercourse, hatred, violence, racism and xenophobia, almost often presented in a humorous light. Their political-related lyrics had led some people to think that the band was militarist, but on closer observation the listener would find the lyrics actually being anti-war. In an interview with Metalkings.com Tom Angelripper said: "Why are we writing about war? Because we don't want war. We wanna describe how bad the war is." The chorus of the song "Ausgebombt" also gives a very clear message: "No trade with death, No trade with arms, Dispense the war, Learn from the past."

Sodom has been influenced or inspired by a variety of music, including AC/DC, Accept, Anvil, Jeff Beck, Black Sabbath, Deep Purple, Fates Warning, Jimi Hendrix, Iron Maiden, Judas Priest, the Mahavishnu Orchestra, Mercyful Fate, Motörhead, Pink Floyd, Queen, Rainbow, Santana, Saxon, Scorpions, Slade, Slayer, Tank, Thin Lizzy, Uriah Heep, Steve Vai, Venom and Frank Zappa. In turn, the band has influenced numerous heavy metal acts such as Burzum, Cannibal Corpse, Dark Tranquility, Deicide, Enslaved, Evildead, Evile, Incantation, Mayhem, Morbid Angel, Necrodeath, Necromantia, Obituary, Rotting Christ, Sepultura and Tsjuder.

Members

Current line-up
Tom Angelripper – bass , vocals 
Frank "Blackfire" Gosdzik – lead guitar , rhythm guitar 
Yorck Segatz – rhythm guitar 
Toni Merkel – drums 

Former members
Christian "Witchhunter" Dudek – drums 
Frank "Aggressor" Testegen – vocals, guitars 
Rainer "Bloody Monster" Focke – drums 
Josef "Grave Violator" Dominic – guitars 
Michael "Destructor" Wulf – guitars 
Uwe Christophers – guitars 
Uwe Baltrusch – guitars 
Michael Hoffmann – guitars 
Andy Brings – guitars 
Guido "Atomic Steiff" Richter – drums 
Dirk "Strahli" Strahlmeier – guitars 
Bernd "Bernemann" Kost – guitars 
Bobby Schottkowski – drums 
Markus "Makka" Freiwald – drums 
Stefan "Husky" Hüskens – drums 

Timeline

Discography

 Obsessed by Cruelty (1986)
 Persecution Mania (1987)
 Agent Orange (1989)
 Better Off Dead (1990)
 Tapping the Vein (1992)
 Get What You Deserve (1994)
 Masquerade in Blood (1995)
 'Til Death Do Us Unite (1997)
 Code Red (1999)
 M-16 (2001)
 Sodom (2006)
 The Final Sign of Evil (2007)
 In War and Pieces (2010)
 Epitome of Torture (2013)
 Decision Day (2016)
 Genesis XIX'' (2020)

References

External links

 
 
 
 
 
 

 
1981 establishments in West Germany
German black metal musical groups
German death metal musical groups
German speed metal musical groups
German thrash metal musical groups
Musical groups established in 1981
Musical quartets
Steamhammer Records artists